Sweater Collection is the debut EP by LØLØ (stylized as "Lo Lo" at the time of release) released on May 3, 2019, by Flying Colours Music, Inc.

Track listing

Charts

References

2019 debut EPs